The H.N. and Frances C. Berger Foundation is a 501(c)(3) nonprofit organization that seeks to assist other nonprofit organizations with financial and/or real estate support, often in the form of grants. The Foundation states that it is particularly interested in assisting other organizations involved in education, health, and social services that; “help people help themselves”. Based in Palm Desert, California, the Foundation primarily supports other organizations in Riverside County, California's Coachella Valley.

References

External links
H.N. and Frances C. Berger Foundation official website.

Non-profit organizations based in California
Organizations based in Riverside County, California
Palm Desert, California
Coachella Valley
1961 establishments in California